Princess Irina Pavlovna Paley (21 December 1903 – 15 November 1990) was the daughter of Grand Duke Paul Alexandrovich of Russia and his second wife, Olga Valerianovna Karnovich.

Early life
Irina was born in Paris because her parents had been exiled for marrying without the permission of Tsar Nicholas II. Her parents' marriage was considered morganatic, meaning that her father had not married a woman of equal rank, and their children took their mother's rank rather than their father's. Irina's mother was later granted the title of Princess Paley by Tsar Nicholas II. The family was allowed to return to Russia during World War I.

Following the Russian Revolution of 1917, Grand Duke Paul, who was too ill to register with the rest of the Romanov family, was under close observation by the new government. Irina later recalled how her father walked with her and her younger sister in the garden and talked about what his marriage had meant to him:

He spoke to us at length about all that he owed to our mother, all that she had brought to him which he had never known in his life before, and about all that she had been to him. He spoke while he walked, and this allowed him to overcome his reserve and his intense shyness. Did he sense then that he had not long to live? I am tempted to believe it and to think that he was asking us to take care of our mother when he could no longer be with her.

Both Irina's father and her brother, Vladimir Pavlovich Paley, were killed by the Bolsheviks. Irina, her mother, and her sister Natalia later escaped to France in 1920.

Marriages
Irina married her first cousin once removed, Prince Feodor Alexandrovich of Russia (1898–1968), son of Grand Duke Alexander Mikhailovich of Russia, on 21 May 1923 in Paris. They later had a son, Prince Michael Feodorovich of Russia, on 4 May 1924.

She began an affair with Count Hubert de Monbrison (15 August 1892 – 14 April 1981) during her marriage to Feodor and bore Hubert a daughter, Irene Romanov, on 7 May 1934, while still married to Feodor. She and Feodor were divorced on 22 July 1936. Irina married Hubert on 11 April 1950 in Paris.

Irina died in Paris on 15 November 1990. She was the last surviving grandchild of Alexander II of Russia. Her son and daughter both have descendants.

Ancestry

Notes

1903 births
1990 deaths
Emigrants from the Russian Empire to France
Russian princesses
Morganatic issue of Romanovs
Princes Paley